Steven P. Whitney is a United States Space Force major general who has served as the military deputy to the assistant secretary of the Air Force for space acquisition and integration since August 24, 2021. He is responsible for research and development, test, production, product support, and modernization of Space Force programs worth more than $15 billion annually. His responsibilities include crafting program strategies and options for representing Department of the Air Force positions to the Office of the Secretary of Defense, Congress and the White House.
 
Whitney graduated in 1992 from the University of Minnesota with a bachelor’s degree in Electrical Engineering and completed the university’s Air Force Reserve Officer Training Corps program as a distinguished graduate. Through the years, he has served in a wide variety of space system acquisition and operations leadership positions within the Air Force, Joint Staff, Office of the Secretary of Defense, and National Reconnaissance Office. Prior to his current position, his assignments included serving as a Crew Commander, Spacecraft Engineer, Senior Flight Commander, Program Element Monitor, Director of Engineering, Squadron Commander, Senior Materiel Leader, Program Director and Program Executive Officer.

Education 
 1992 Bachelors of Electrical Engineering, University of Minnesota, Minneapolis
 1997 Squadron Officer School, Distinguished Graduate, Maxwell Air Force Base, Ala.
 2000 Master of Arts, Administrative Sciences, The George Washington University, Washington, D.C.
 2004 Air Command and Staff College, Maxwell AFB, Ala., by correspondence
 2005 Master of Science, Systems Engineering, Distinguished Graduate, Air Force Institute of Technology, Wright-Patterson AFB, Ohio
 2007 Air War College, Maxwell AFB, Ala., by correspondence
 2011 Master of Science, National Security Strategy, Fort Lesley J. McNair, Washington, D.C.
 2013 Program Managers Course, Defense Acquisition University, Fort Belvoir, Va.
 2014 Executive Program Managers Course, Defense Acquisition University, Fort Belvoir, Va.

Military career 

In September 2022, Whitney was nominated for promotion to major general.

Assignments 
 
1. April 1993–July 1996, Defense Support Program & Defense Meteorological Satellite Program Crew Commander and Chief, DSP Spacecraft Engineering; 1st Space Operations Squadron, Schriever Air Force Base, Colo.
2. July 1996–June 1998, Chief, Commanders Action Group and FDS Operations Manager; Space-Based Infrared System Program Office, Los Angeles AFB, Calif.
3. June 1998–June 2000, Air Force Intern, Directorate of Space and Nuclear Deterrence, Office of the Secretary of the Air Force and Force Management Policy, Office of the Secretary of Defense, the Pentagon, Arlington, Va.
4. June 2000–May 2004, Senior Flight Commander; Chief, Production Division and Director of Engineering, Air Force Communications Support Facility, White Sands Missile Range, Las Cruces, N.M.
5. May 2004–June 2005, Student, Air Force Institute of Technology; Wright-Patterson AFB, Ohio
6. June 2005–May 2008, MILSATCOM Program Element Monitor and Chief, Congressional & Media Affairs, Space Acquisition Directorate, Office of the Under Secretary of the Air Force, the Pentagon, Arlington, Va.
7. June 2008–July 2010, Commander, Enterprise Operations Squadron, Mission Operations Directorate, National Reconnaissance Office, Chantilly, Va.
8. August 2010–June 2011, Student, National War College, Fort Lesley J. McNair, Washington, D.C.
9. June 2011–July 2013, Chief, Space/C4 Branch and Space Lead, Joint Chiefs of Staff (J8), the Pentagon, Arlington, Va.
10. July 2013–July 2015, Senior Materiel Leader, Global Positioning System User Equipment Division, Global Positioning Systems Directorate, Space and Missile Systems Center, Los Angeles AFB, Calif.
11. July 2015–June 2019, Director, Global Positioning Systems Directorate, Space and Missile Systems Center, Los Angeles AFB, Calif.
12. October 2018–June 2019, Program Executive Officer for Space Production, Space and Missile Systems Center, Los Angeles AFB, Calif.
13. July 2019–July 2020, Deputy to the Assistant Secretary of Defense for Sustainment, Office of the Under Secretary of Defense for Acquisition and Sustainment, the Pentagon, Arlington, Va.
14. August 2020–August 2021, Director, Space Programs, Office of the Assistant Secretary of the Air Force for Acquisition, Headquarters U.S. Air Force, the Pentagon, Arlington, Va.
15. August 2021–present, Military Deputy, Office of the Assistant Secretary of the Air Force for Space Acquisition and Integration, Headquarters U.S. Air Force, the Pentagon, Arlington, Va.

Awards and decorations
Whitney is the recipient of the following awards:

Dates of promotions

Writings

References 

Living people
United States Air Force generals
United States Space Force generals
Year of birth missing (living people)